Karma-Ann Swanepoel was the lead singer of Henry Ate, a South African rock band. She subsequently went solo, releasing her first album Karma in 1998. The South African-born singer shot to fame in the mid-1990s with hit songs such as "Just" and "Henry Ate".

Career
Swanepoel attained success in South Africa. Her song "Just" was counted as No. 1 in the 5FM 2001 countdown. Karma moved to the US in 2003.

Her musical style encompasses folk, acoustic, and South African harmony.

Civil litigation with Lil Wayne
Henry Ate's/Karma's song "Once" was sampled by Lil Wayne in the mixtape track, "I Feel Like Dying". The lawsuit accuses the recording artist of copyright infringement. Karma-Ann Swanepoel claimed Lil Wayne did not have permission to sample the song and is suing for compensatory damages. Lil Wayne did not profit directly from the song – it was leaked to the internet and passed via peer-to-peer websites and not sold on any retail album.

Discography
Slap in the Face [1996]
One Day Soon (as Karma) [1998]
Torn and Tattered [2000]
96 - 02 - The Singles [2002]
Don't Walk Fly [2005]
Working Title [2005]
Even If She Tried [2008]
Paper Cuts [2008]

References

External links
 Karma the band's official website
 Karma's Myspace profile
 Karma's Myspace preview profile

Year of birth missing (living people)
Living people
Afrikaner people
21st-century South African women singers
20th-century South African women singers
South African emigrants to the United States